Ambatomanga is a town and commune in Madagascar. It belongs to the district of Manjakandriana, which is a part of Analamanga Region. The population of the commune was estimated to be approximately 6,049 in 2018.

Primary and junior level secondary education are available in town. The majority 67% of the population of the commune are farmers, while an additional 25% receives their livelihood from raising livestock. The most important crop is rice, while other important products are cassava and sweet potatoes. Industry and services provide employment for 3% and 5% of the population, respectively.

References 
Monographie Ambtomanga

Populated places in Analamanga